The Martres-Tolosane station is a railway station in Martres-Tolosane, Occitania, France. The station is on the Toulouse–Bayonne railway. The station is served by TER (local) services operated by the SNCF.

Train services
The following services currently call at Martres-Tolosane:
local service (TER Occitanie) Toulouse–Saint-Gaudens–Tarbes–Pau

References

Railway stations in France opened in 1862
Railway stations in Haute-Garonne